The S'gaw Karen alphabet is an abugida used for writing Karen. It was derived from the Burmese script in the early 19th century, and ultimately from either the Kadamba or Pallava alphabet of South India. The S'gaw Karen alphabet is also used for the liturgical languages of Pali and Sanskrit.

Alphabet
The Karen alphabet was created by American missionary Jonathan Wade in the 1830s, based on the S'gaw Karen language; Wade was assisted by a Karen named Paulah. The consonants and most of the vowels are adopted from the Burmese alphabet; however, the Karen pronunciation of the letters is slightly different from that of the Burmese alphabet. Since Karen has more tones than Burmese, additional tonal markers were added.

The script is taught in the refugee camps in Thailand and in Kayin State.

Bibliography
 
 
 
 
 
 
 

 
 
Karen language
S'gaw Karen
Karen people
1830 introductions